Twassa Feyi is the debut album of Lebanese artist Yara and was produced and composed by the man who introduced her into the music industry Tarek Abou Jaoudeh in 2005. Tarek composed her first single, "Hob Kbir", for her and it met with relative success. The album has songs in the Egyptian and Lebanese Arabic dialects.

Track listing 
"Bala Eshq"    4:00  
"Law Basseli (Gayya We Eidi Ala Albi)" 4:01  
"W Ana Janbak"  
"Hob Kbeer"    4:33   
"Lamma Tettalla" 3:28    
"Twassa Feyi"    3:24   
"Nseetni Zaman"  4:41    
"Alf Zayyak"     4:33   
"Ayam"           4:14

Credits 
Mohamed Moustafa, arranger 
Khaled Ezz, arranger
Hadi Sharara, arranger, engineer 
Ziad Boutros, arranger, engineer
Tarek Abou Jaoudeh, composer, producer

References

2005 albums